Abhijit Guha may refer to:

 Abhijit Guha (Indian Army officer), Indian Army general
 Abhijit Guha (director), Indian film director, actor and writer